The Ven. Richard Henry Owen was Archdeacon of St Asaph from 1964 to 1970.

He was born in 1899 and educated at the University of Wales and ordained in 1921. He began his career as a Curate in Colwyn Bay. After this he held incumbencies at Llantysilio, Bangor-on-Dee, Rhosymedre and Prestatyn, and finally St John's Church, Trofarth.

He died on 19 August 1977.

Notes

1899 births
Alumni of the University of Wales
20th-century Welsh Anglican priests
Archdeacons of St Asaph
1977 deaths